Ozzie Zehner is an author and visiting scholar. He was the author of Green Illusions: The Dirty Secrets of Clean Energy and the Future of Environmentalism, and co-producer of the 2019 environmental documentary Planet of the Humans.  He grew up in Kalamazoo, Michigan, and is a graduate of Kettering University and the University of Amsterdam.

In the Bangor Daily News, Mark W. Anderson writes, in an article about stereotypes about environmentalists, that Ozzie Zehner has exposed the adverse effects of supposedly “clean energy.”  He writes, “Zehner makes clear that…[a] healthy future will require much more from us than shifting from fossil fuels to the chimera of clean energy.”  He quotes Zehner as saying, “[t]he ‘energy crisis’ is more cultural than technological in nature.”

In IEEE Spectrum, Ozzie Zehner writes, in response to critics of a previous article by him in the same publication, that there are limits to measuring carbon dioxide:  “Perhaps we should expand our horizons to measure the virtues of electric cars against those of walkable neighborhoods, and the costs of generating more energy against the savings from using less.”

References

External links
 
 

American non-fiction environmental writers
Kettering University alumni
University of Amsterdam alumni
Year of birth missing (living people)
Living people
People from Kalamazoo, Michigan